The Lovin' Spoonful Greatest Hits is a compilation album by the folk rock group The Lovin' Spoonful, released on Buddha Records on February 22, 2000. The album contains every Top 40 hit single enjoyed by the band in the United States including its only chart-topper, "Summer in the City." The original recordings were produced by Erik Jacobsen, and originally released on Kama Sutra Records.

Content
This compilation contains all eleven singles released by the band in the United States during the 1965–1968 tenure of its principal songwriter, John Sebastian. Of those, all charted and the first seven made the top ten on the Billboard Hot 100. The song "Never Going Back" appeared in the summer of 1968 as the first single after Sebastian had left the band. An additional single, "Jug Band Music," was released in Canada only but appeared on the band's second album in the US. The title song to the Francis Ford Coppola film You're A Big Boy Now was intended as a single but withdrawn at the time; it and its b-side "Lonely (Amy's Theme)" are included in this compilation.

Five of these tracks appeared as b-sides, and all 26 tracks appeared on the five albums and two soundtrack albums released by the group during its lifetime. The song "Younger Generation" was performed by Sebastian in his unscheduled appearance at Woodstock; it also appears in the film.

Reception

In his Allmusic review, music critic Hal Horowitz wrote "...the 2000 issue of the umpteenth collection from this short-lived '60s band gets the nod over all others. Taken from the original first-generation masters, apparently for the first time, the sound quality – with a crispness and definition previously unheard – and even track selection, is the finest yet." This release is the website's album pick in the compilation section of the band's AllMusic discography.

Track listing

Personnel
John Sebastian — vocals, guitars, autoharp, harmonica, organ all tracks except "Never Going Back"
Steve Boone – bass, vocals
Joe Butler — drums, percussion, vocals
Zal Yanovsky — electric and acoustic guitars, vocals tracks 1–22
Jerry Yester — guitars, banjo, keyboards, vocals tracks 23–26

References

The Lovin' Spoonful albums
2000 compilation albums
Buddah Records albums